William Henry Bishop (1847-1928) was a United States novelist.

Biography
He was born in Hartford, Connecticut, and graduated from Yale University in 1867. He became a member of the American Academy of Arts and Letters Department of Literature in 1918.

Works
The best-known of his novels and sketches are: Detmold (1879); The House of a Merchant Prince (1882); Choy Susan and Other Stories (1884); Fish and Men in the Maine Islands (1885); The Golden Justice (1887); The Brownstone Boy and Other Queer People (1888); A House Hunter in Europe (1893); Writing to Rosina (1894). Old Mexico and Her Lost Provinces (1883) is a book of travel.

References

External links 

 William Henry Bishop papers (MS 83). Manuscripts and Archives, Yale University Library. 

1847 births
1928 deaths
19th-century American novelists
Yale University alumni
Members of the American Academy of Arts and Letters